Pasquale Panìco (10 May 1926 – 21 January 2018) was an Italian politician who was a Senator from 1979 to 1992.

References

1926 births
2018 deaths
20th-century Italian politicians
Senators of Legislature VIII of Italy
Italian Communist Party politicians
People from Cerignola